Finn Tearney (born 27 September 1990) is a tennis player from New Zealand.

Tearney has a career high ATP singles ranking of 356 achieved on 10 October 2016 and a career high ATP doubles ranking of 402 achieved on 8 February 2016.

He has won two ITF Futures singles titles and six ITF Futures doubles titles.

Tearney made his ATP main draw debut at the 2015 Heineken Open, where he received a wildcard into the doubles competition, partnering Wesley Whitehouse. He made his ATP singles main draw debut at the 2016 ASB Classic.

He has become very much a part-time player on the professional circuit as he continues his academic career at Durham University in England, but returned to New Zealand in December 2018 to successfully defend his New Zealand title.

Career
Winning the New Zealand championships gained Tearney a wild card entry into the qualifying draw for the 2019 ASB Classic, where he lost in the first round to Thomas Fabbiano. A few weeks later he was in Portugal where, in an epic match with more than a dozen rallies of twenty shots or more, he beat Jacob Grills in the final of the ITF Futures tournament in Vale do Lobo.

Tearney was called up to the New Zealand Davis Cup team in March 2020 for their tie against Venezuela, despite no longer playing tennis professionally and working for a property development company, and defeated Jordi Muñoz Abreu in the first singles rubber in straight sets 6–4 6–4.

Challenger & ITF Tour Finals

Singles: 4 (2 titles, 2 runners-up)

Doubles: 11 (6 titles, 5 runners-up)

References

External links

Finn Tearney at the Pepperdine Waves

1990 births
Living people
New Zealand male tennis players
Tennis players from Auckland
Sportspeople from Wellington City
Pepperdine Waves men's tennis players
Alumni of Durham University